The following is a list of county routes in Passaic County in the United States state of New Jersey.  For more information on the county route system in New Jersey as a whole, including its history, see County routes in New Jersey.

500-series county routes
The following 500-series county routes serve Passaic County:

CR 502, CR 504, CR 509, CR 511, CR 511 Alt., CR 513

Other county routes

See also

References

 
Passaic